Ivar Leveraas (born 17 July 1939) is a Norwegian civil servant and politician for the Labour Party.

Leveraas was born in Haugesund. A mechanic by education, he worked as a secretary in Arbeidernes Opplysningsforbund (AOF) from 1970 to 1975. From 1975 to 1986 he was the secretary of the Labour party. He then was CEO of the Norwegian State Housing Bank from 1986 to 1994 and director of the Norwegian Labour Inspection Authority from 1994 to 2006.
In 2006, Leveraas was appointed by the Government as leader of The National Council for Senior Citizens. He is now in his second term for the council.

He has also graduated from the military academy and has a financial-administrative qualification and a masters in management and leadership.  
 
He was awarded the King's Medal of Merit in gold in 2006.

References

1935 births
Living people
Directors of government agencies of Norway
Labour Party (Norway) politicians
People from Haugesund